Mary-Anne Fahey (born 19 August 1955 as Mary-Anne Waterman) is an Australian actress, comedian and writer.

Biography
Fahey has starred in and written for numerous comedy programs including The Comedy Company, Kittson Fahey, the first Australian female-only sketch comedy program, Get a Life and One Size Fits All. She had roles in Future Schlock, The Dunera Boys, All the Rivers Run II, Celia, Lucky Break and SeaChange. She has received roles in theatre including Mary Lives. 

She is most famous for her work on Channel Ten's The Comedy Company especially for her school girl character, Kylie Mole, and three-year-old "Jophesine", the Play School Sketches with Glenn Robbins and the Bedscene sketches with her then real-life husband Ian McFadyen.

In the 1980s she appeared in an advertisement for David Reid electronics, which was promoting the Commodore Amiga 500.

Kylie Mole

Fahey's Kylie Mole character—a scowling schoolgirl—was so popular she published the best-selling novel My Diary by Kylie Mole. She released a Double A-Side single with tracks "So Excellent"/"I Go, I Go", which hit #8 on the Australian ARIA chart in November 1988. A music video for "So Excellent" was filmed. The Kylie Mole character was one of several iconic characters that appeared in the show. Her characterisation especially resonated with Australian youth. The Australian adoption of the word "bogan" was first popularised in the media by Kylie Mole, and other phrases she used gained a wider currency.

Later career
Fahey is lives in Melbourne and is concentrating on writing and children's theatre. In May 2007, she published her first children's novel, I, Nigel Dorking: An Autobiography about a Boy with an Unusual Vocabulary, a Suit of Armour and an Unshakeable Dream, Written by That Very Boy (Nigel Dorking), Grade Six ( and ).

Awards
Fahey won a 1989 Logie Award for "Most Popular Light Entertainment/Comedy Personality" for her work on The Comedy Company. She has won an AWGIE Award and an Irish-dancing trophy where she came second in a competition of two.

Personal life 
Fahey has two sons. Thomas Fahey, from her first marriage, and James McFadyen, born 12 July 1990. Fahey and Ian McFadyen split up in 1992. From 1994 until 2011 her partner was children's writer Morris Gleitzman. He too has a background in comedy writing as a former writer for The Norman Gunston Show, and a satirical columnist for The Sydney Morning Herald and The Age.

From 2014 Fahey has been in a relationship with Paul Jennings, another children's book writer who had previously collaborated with Morris Gleitzman on two books series, Wicked and Deadly.

References

External links

 Number 8 on the ARIA chart, 1988.
Interview of Mary-Anne Fahey and Mark Mitchell, by George Negus. broadcast by the Australian Broadcasting Corporation at 6.30 pm on 26 September 2002.
Book Review of I, Nigel Dorking by Sue Bursztynski (januarymagazine.com)
Humorous author's bio for Mary-Anne Fahey (Penguin Books (Australia) website)
Ask an Author: Mary-Anne Fahey (Fahey responds to questions from readers about her new book. The Age newspaper online, 7 May 2007. Accessed 11 August 2007. Includes current picture of Fahey.

1955 births
Actresses from Melbourne
Australian television actresses
Australian women comedians
Australian comedy writers
Comedians from Melbourne
Living people
Logie Award winners